DCLXVI: To Ride, Shoot Straight and Speak the Truth is the fourth album by the Swedish metal band Entombed, released in 1997.  DCLXVI is 666 in Roman numerals. The cover art features a statuette of the Aztec god Mictlantecuhtli. This album shows a continuation of the death 'n' roll sound previously established on 1993's "Wolverine Blues", but eschews most traces of hardcore and traditional death metal in favor of a stoner rock and garage rock influenced sound.

The album was Metal Hammer magazine's #2 album of 1997. It was beaten by UK band Feeder's debut album Polythene.

Track listing

A limited digipak edition came with a bonus CD titled Family Favourites featuring four cover songs:

Trivia
The song "To Ride, Shoot Straight and Speak the Truth" was featured in the 2003 skateboarding video game Tony Hawk's Underground.

Personnel
Entombed
 Lars-Göran Petrov – vocals
 Jörgen Sandström – bass
 Uffe "Monster" Cederlund – guitar
 Alex Hellid – guitar, artwork
 Nicke Andersson – drums, artwork

Production
 Entombed – produced
 Tomas Skogsberg – produced, engineered, mixed, recorded
 Enginestudio – artwork, design
 Guerilla Art – artwork
 Neil Rapi – photography
 Steve Gurney – live sound
 Fred Estby – assist

References

1997 albums
Entombed (band) albums